Piano Sonata No. 1 in D minor, Op. 28, is a piano sonata by Sergei Rachmaninoff, completed in 1908. It is the first of three "Dresden pieces", along with the Symphony No. 2 and part of an opera, which were composed in the quiet city of Dresden, Germany. It was originally inspired by Goethe's tragic play Faust; although Rachmaninoff abandoned the idea soon after beginning composition, traces of this influence can still be found. After numerous revisions and substantial cuts made at the advice of his colleagues, he completed it on April 11, 1908. Konstantin Igumnov gave the premiere in Moscow on October 17, 1908. It received a lukewarm response there, and remains one of the least performed of Rachmaninoff's works.

It has three movements, and takes about 35 minutes to perform. The sonata is structured like a typical Classical sonata, with fast movements surrounding a slower, more tender second movement. The movements feature sprawling themes and ambitious climaxes within their own structure, all the while building towards a prodigious culmination. Although this first sonata is a substantial and comprehensive work, its successor, Piano Sonata No. 2 (Op. 36), written five years later, became the better regarded of the two. Nonetheless, it, too, was given serious cuts and opinions are mixed about those.

Background 
In November 1906, Rachmaninoff, with his wife and daughter, moved to Dresden primarily to compose a second symphony to diffuse the critical failure of his first symphony, but also to escape the distractions of Moscow. There they lived a quiet life, as he wrote in a letter, "We live here like hermits: we see nobody, we know nobody, and we go nowhere. I work a great deal," but even without distraction he had considerable difficulty in composing his first piano sonata, especially concerning its form. The original idea for it was to be a program sonata based on the main characters of the tragic play Faust by Johann Wolfgang von Goethe: Faust, Gretchen, and Mephistopheles, and indeed it nearly parallels Franz Liszt's own Faust Symphony which is made of three movements which reflect those characters. However, the idea was abandoned shortly after composition began, although the theme is still clear in the final version.

Rachmaninoff enlisted the help of Nikita Morozov, one of his classmates from Anton Arensky's class back in the Moscow Conservatory, to discuss how the sonata rondo form applied to his sprawling work. At this time he was invited, along with Alexander Glazunov, Nikolai Rimsky-Korsakov, Alexander Scriabin, and Feodor Chaliapin, to a concert in Paris the following spring held by Sergei Diaghilev to soothe France–Russia relations, although Diaghilev hated his music. Begrudgingly, Rachmaninoff decided to attend only for the money, since he would have preferred to spend time on this and his Symphony No. 2 (his opera project, Monna Vanna, had been dropped). Writing to Morozov before he left in May 1907, he expressed his doubt in the musicality of the sonata and deprecated its length, even though at this time he had completed only the second movement.

On returning to his Ivanovka estate from the Paris concert, he stopped in Moscow to perform an early version of the sonata to contemporaries Nikolai Medtner, Georgy Catoire, Konstantin Igumnov, and Lev Conus. With their input, he shortened the original 45-minute-long piece to around 35 minutes. He completed the work on April 11, 1908. Igumnov gave the premiere of the sonata on October 17, 1908, in Moscow, and he gave the first performance of the work in Berlin and Leipzig as well, although Rachmaninoff missed all three of these performances.

Composition 

The piece is structured as a typical sonata in the Classical period: the first movement is a long Allegro moderato (moderately quick), the second a Lento (very slow), and the third an Allegro molto (very fast).

 Allegro moderato (in D minor, ends in D major)
The substantial first movement Allegro moderato presents most of the thematic material and motifs revisited in the later movements.
Juxtaposed in the intro is a motif revisited throughout the movement: a quiet, questioning fifth answered by a defiant authentic cadence, followed by a solemn chord progression. This densely thematic expression is taken to represent the turmoil of Faust's mind.
The movement closes quietly in D major. 
 Lento (in F major)
In key, the movement pretends to start in D major before settling in the home key of F major. Although the shortest in length and performance time, the second movement Lento provides technical difficulty in following long melodic lines, navigating multiple overlapping voices, and coherently performing the detailed climax, which includes a small cadenza.
 Allegro molto (in D minor)
Ending the sonata is the furious third movement Allegro molto. Lacking significant thematic content, the movement serves rather to exploit the piano's character, not without expense of sonority. The very first measures of the first movement are revisited, and then dissolves into the enormous climax, a tour de force replete with full-bodied chords typical of Rachmaninoff, which decisively ends the piece in D minor.

Reception 
Rachmaninoff played early versions of the piece to Oskar von Riesemann (who later became his biographer), who did not like it. Konstantin Igumnov expressed interest upon first hearing it in Moscow, and following his suggestion Rachmaninoff cut about 110 bars.

The sonata had a mediocre evaluation after Igumnov's premiere in Moscow.  Nikolai Rimsky-Korsakov had died several months previously, and the burden of heading Russian classical music had fallen on this all-Rachmaninoff programme of October 17, 1908.  Although the concert, which also included Rachmaninoff's Variations on a Theme of Chopin (Op. 22, 1903), was "filled to overflowing", one critic called the sonata dry and repetitive, however redeeming the interesting details and innovative structures were.

Lee-Ann Nelson, via her 2006 dissertation, noted that Rachmaninoff's revisions are always cuts, with the material simply excised and discarded. The hypothesis is that the frequency of negative responses to many of his pieces, not just the response to the first symphony, led to a deep insecurity, particularly with regard to length. The musicologists Efstratiou and Martyn argued against, for instance, the cuts made to the second sonata on a formal basis. Unlike other pieces, such as the second piano sonata and the fourth piano concerto, no uncut version of this piece is currently known to be extant.

Today the sonata remains less well-known than Rachmaninoff's second sonata, and is not as frequently performed or recorded.  Champions of the work tend to be pianists renowned for their large repertoire.  It has been recorded by Eteri Andjaparidze, Vladimir Ashkenazy, Boris Berezovsky, İdil Biret, Sergio Fiorentino, Leslie Howard, Ruth Laredo, Valentina Lisitsa, Nikolai Lugansky, Olli Mustonen, John Ogdon, Michael Ponti, Santiago Rodriguez, Alexander Romanovsky, Howard Shelley, Daniil Trifonov, Xiayin Wang, Rustem Hayroudinoff, Alexis Weissenberg and Steven Osborne. Lugansky performs the piece regularly.

References

Sources

External links 
 
  Piano.ru – Sheet music download
  Chubrik.ru – Audio download

1908 compositions
Piano music by Sergei Rachmaninoff
Rachmaninoff
Compositions in D minor